Saint Sindulf of Rheims (or Sindulphus, Sindulphe, Sandou, Sendou; died ) was a hermit who lived near Reims.
His feast day is 20 October.

Monks of Ramsgate account

The monks of St Augustine's Abbey, Ramsgate, wrote in their Book of Saints (1921),

Butler's account

The hagiographer Alban Butler (1710–1773) wrote in his Lives of the Fathers, Martyrs, and Other Principal Saints, under October 20,

Notes

Sources

 
 

7th-century Frankish saints
660 deaths